Cheung King Wai MH  (born 3 September 1985) is a Hong Kong former professional racing cyclist, who won a gold medal at the 2006 Asian Games in the points race. Cheung currently works as a directeur sportif for UCI Continental team.

His younger brother, Cheung King Lok is also a famous professional cyclist in Asia.

Major results
Source:

2006
 1st Points race, Asian Games
 1st  Road race, Chinese National Road Championships
 3rd Points race, Asian Track Championships
2008
 8th Overall Tour of Hong Kong Shanghai
1st Stage 4
2010
 2nd Team pursuit, Asian Games
 5th Overall Tour de Taiwan
2011
 1st  Team pursuit, Chinese National Track Championships
 2nd Team pursuit, Asian Track Championships
2012
 2nd Team pursuit, Asian Track Championships
 2nd Road race, Hong Kong National Road Championships
2013
 Hong Kong National Track Championships
1st  Kilo
1st  Keirin
1st  Team pursuit
 1st  Road race, Hong Kong National Road Championships
 3rd Tour de Okinawa
2014
 1st  Team pursuit, Hong Kong National Track Championships
 2nd Team pursuit, Asian Team Pursuit Championships
 Hong Kong National Road Championships
2nd Time trial
3rd Road race

References

External links

Living people
1985 births
Hong Kong male cyclists
Hong Kong track cyclists
Place of birth missing (living people)
Asian Games medalists in cycling
Cyclists at the 2006 Asian Games
Cyclists at the 2010 Asian Games
Cyclists at the 2014 Asian Games
Asian Games gold medalists for Hong Kong
Asian Games silver medalists for Hong Kong
Medalists at the 2006 Asian Games
Medalists at the 2010 Asian Games